John Cummings (born 5 May 1944) is a Scottish former footballer who played at centre-forward for Aberdeen, Port Vale, Ayr United, Clydebank, and the Philadelphia Atoms. He helped Ayr United to win the Second Division title in 1965–66.

Career
Cummings played for Aberdeen, and scored in his only First Division appearance, in a 1–0 win over Falkirk at Brockville Park on 6 March 1965. He was allowed to leave Pittodrie by manager Eddie Turnbull at the end of the 1964–65 season. He signed with English club Port Vale in July 1965, as part of manager Jackie Mudie's plan to trial young Scottish players. He made three appearances in the Fourth Division, one in the League Cup and two in the FA Cup and scored one goal in the FA Cup in a 2–2 draw with Oxford United at the Manor Ground. After failing to gain a regular place in the team his contract was cancelled in March 1966 and he moved back to Scotland to play for Ayr United. He scored two goals in four Second Division games, as the "Honest Men" were promoted as champions. He then left Somerset Park for Clydebank, and scored twice in 11 Second Division games in the 1966–67 campaign, before scoring two further goals in the 1967–68 season. In 1975, he played seven games in the North American Soccer League for the Philadelphia Atoms.

Career statistics
Source:

Honours
Ayr United
Scottish Football League Second Division: 1965–66

References

1944 births
Living people
Footballers from Greenock
Scottish footballers
Association football forwards
Aberdeen F.C. players
Port Vale F.C. players
Ayr United F.C. players
Clydebank F.C. (1965) players
Cambuslang Rangers F.C. players
Philadelphia Atoms players
Scottish Football League players
English Football League players
North American Soccer League (1968–1984) players
Scottish expatriate footballers
Scottish expatriate sportspeople in the United States
Expatriate soccer players in the United States
Scottish Junior Football Association players